The Georgia Tech–Virginia Tech football rivalry, also known as the TechMo Bowl and Battle of the Techs, is an American college football rivalry between the Georgia Tech Yellow Jackets and Virginia Tech Hokies. Both universities are members of the Atlantic Coast Conference (ACC) and play football in the Coastal Division.

History
As co-members of the Atlantic Coast Conference, Georgia Tech and Virginia Tech regularly meet in all varsity sports in which both schools field a team. Prior to the Hokies joining the ACC in 2004, the two teams had only met once previously. An additional scheduled meeting in 2000 was canceled after the teams took the field due to torrential rain and lightning). The rivalry is most pronounced on the football field, however, where the schools play annually in the ACC's Coastal Division, often with significant divisional implications. Between 2005 (when the ACC adopted the divisional format for football) and 2012, one of these two teams represented the ACC Coastal Division in every ACC Championship Game (Virginia Tech in 2005, 2007, 2008, 2010, 2011;  Georgia Tech in 2006, 2009 and 2012). 

The rivalry has seen both teams come into the game ranked in the top 25, including the 2009 game in which both teams came into the game with 1 loss and the No. 19 Yellow Jackets upset the No. 4 Hokies. The 2011 game also saw both teams ranked in the BCS top 25, with the No. 10 Hokies beating the No. 20 Yellow Jackets.

Georgia Tech became the first conference opponent to win three consecutive games in Lane Stadium against Virginia Tech.

On June 28, 2022, the ACC announced that they would do away with divisions beginning  in the 2023 season, with each team playing 3 permanent rivals every years and playing 5 other rotating teams. Because of this, Georgia Tech and Virginia Tech will only play each other every other year through at least 2026.

Game results

See also  
 List of NCAA college football rivalry games

References

College football rivalries in the United States
Georgia Tech Yellow Jackets football
Virginia Tech Hokies football